Molinos is a department located in Salta Province, Argentina.

With an area of  it borders Cachi Department to the north, San Carlos Department to the east, Catamarca Province to the west, and Los Andes Department to the northwest.

Towns and municipalities
 Molinos 
 Seclantás

References

External links 

 Departments of Salta Province website

Departments of Salta Province